RNLB H F Bailey (ON 670) was the first Royal National Lifeboat Institution (RNLI) lifeboat powered by a motor, that served from Cromer Lifeboat Station.

Description
The lifeboat was built in 1923 by J. Samuel White at Cowes on the Isle of Wight. The lifeboat was powered by an 80 bhp Weyburn DE6 engine and was a Norfolk and Suffolk-class lifeboat.

Donor
The Cromer station had four motor-powered lifeboats all called H F Bailey, after the donor, a Mr Henry Francis Bailey of Brockenhurst, a London merchant who was born in Norfolk and had died in 1916.

New boathouse

To accommodate this new motor lifeboat a new lifeboat house and slipway were built on the end of the Cromer Pier. The planning and building of this new boathouse was carried out three years before the arrival of H F Bailey and was ready on the day that the new lifeboat arrived in the town. The house had a solid concrete floor. The new lifeboat house cost £32,000. This boathouse remained in constant use until 1995 finally being replaced with a new station in 1999. The 1923 station now resides at Southwold.

Service and rescues
H F  Bailey (ON 670) was the Cromer No. 1 boat on station for just one year but due to problems with her launch and recovery, on the slipway, she was transferred to Great Yarmouth & Gorleston on 5 May 1924, where she served until 1939

See also
Cromer Lifeboat H F Bailey ON 694
Cromer Lifeboat H F Bailey III

References

Cromer lifeboats
Norfolk and Suffolk-class lifeboats